Eskişehir Eti Archaeology Museum, a.k.a. Eskişehir Archaeology Museum, is a national archaeology museum in Eskişehir, Turkey. It was established in 1974.

Location
The street to the east of the museum is Müze Street named after the museum.

Background
In 1974, the museum moved to its own building. As this building became insufficient, a new building was constructed, which was financed and donated by ETİ Food Industry, a cookie producer based in Eskişehir. On 28 May 2011, the museum was reopened in its new and larger building.

Museum building
The building consists of three blocks. One block is reserved for the administration and auxiliary services such as library, laboratory, photo lab, etc. The basement of the two other blocks are stock rooms. The ground floor of one block is a conference hall and the ground floor of the other block is multipurpose art gallery. The museum exhibition halls are situated in the upper floors of both blocks.

Collection

The exhibited items span Neolithic, Chalcolithic, Bronze Age, Hittite, Phrygian, Hellenistic, Roman, Byzantine and Ottoman periods. There are marble sculptures and figurines, steles, earthenware, metallic and glass gadgets for daily use, idols, ornaments, weapons etc. There is also an elephant tusk in the natural history section of the museum.

References

Archaeological museums in Turkey
1974 establishments in Turkey
Museums established in 1974
Museums in Eskişehir